Trent Jordan Watt (born October 11, 1994) is an American football outside linebacker for the Pittsburgh Steelers of the National Football League (NFL). He played college football at Wisconsin, and was drafted by the Steelers in the first round of the 2017 NFL Draft. His older brothers are J. J. Watt and Derek Watt. He was a finalist for the NFL Defensive Player of the Year award in 2019 and 2020 before winning the award in 2021. In 2021, Watt signed a four-year extension worth over $112 million, including $80 million guaranteed, making him the highest-paid defensive player in the NFL. Despite missing two games in 2021, he tied the single-season NFL record for most quarterback sacks in a season, matching Michael Strahan's 22.5-sack record set in 2001.

College career

Coming out of Pewaukee High School, Watt was rated as a three-star recruit by various recruiting services.

Watt started his collegiate career as a tight end recruit for the Wisconsin Badgers. Watt's knee was injured in the 2014 season and he was in the recovery process until the middle of the 2015 season. He did not play a game from October 2012 to September 2015.

In July 2015, Watt was asked by head coach Paul Chryst to switch to a defensive position as a redshirt sophomore. Badgers' outside linebackers coach Tim Tibesar recalled Watt's position change saying, "At that time, even though he was in his third fall at Wisconsin, it was kind of like having a freshman come in. You're trying to teach him for the first time how to play outside 'backer in our system." After the fourth game of his junior season, he led the Big Ten conference in sacks. In the Michigan State game, he was named the Big Ten Player of the Week and was given the Walter Camp National Defensive Player of the Week Award.

During the 2016 season, Watt recorded 59 total tackles and 11.5 sacks. Additionally, he recorded an interception and a defensive touchdown during the Badgers' game against Purdue. Watt also received first-team All-American honors by Sports Illustrated and second-team honors by The Associated Press for his play during the 2016 season. On November 29, 2016, Watt was named first-team All-Big Ten. On January 3, 2017, Watt announced on Twitter that he would forgo his senior season and enter the 2017 NFL Draft.

Statistics

Professional career
Watt received an invitation to the NFL Combine as one of the top edge rushers in the draft and completed all the combine drills. Among linebackers, Watt finished second in the vertical jump and three-cone drill, tied for first in the broad jump (with Jabrill Peppers), and also tied for first in the short shuttle. He attended Wisconsin's pro day, along with  Dare Ogunbowale, Vince Biegel, Corey Clement, Sojourn Shelton, and six other teammates. Green Bay Packers' General Manager Ted Thompson and Pittsburgh Steelers' head coach Mike Tomlin were among the 65 team representatives and scouts present for his pro day as Pittsburgh Steelers' linebacker's coach Joey Porter, Carolina Panthers' and New York Jets' outside linebackers coach Kevin Greene led Watt's positional drills. The majority of NFL draft experts and analysts projected Watt to be a late first round or second round pick. He was ranked the second best outside linebacker in the draft by NFLDraftScout.com, ranked the fourth best outside linebacker by NFL analyst Bucky Brooks, and was ranked the ninth best edge rusher by Sports Illustrated. ESPN also ranked Watt the 44th best prospect available in the draft.

The Pittsburgh Steelers selected Watt in the first round with the 30th overall pick in the 2017 NFL Draft. Watt was the fourth linebacker selected and the second outside linebacker. He was also the fourth linebacker taken in the first round by the Pittsburgh Steelers since .

2017 season
On June 14, 2017, the Pittsburgh Steelers signed Watt to a fully guaranteed, four-year, $9.25 million contract with a signing bonus of $4.87 million.

He entered training camp competing with James Harrison for the starting right outside linebacker position. Watt was named the Pittsburgh Steelers' starting right outside linebacker to begin the regular season. Watt saw action in the NFL for the first time in the team's first preseason game against the New York Giants, where he made two sacks in the 20–12 victory.

Watt made his professional regular season debut and first NFL start in the Pittsburgh Steelers' season-opener against the Cleveland Browns on September 10, 2017, where he recorded seven combined tackles, two sacks, and intercepted a pass from quarterback DeShone Kizer, as the Steelers won by a score of 21–18. The following week, he assisted on two tackles before leaving during the first half of the Steelers' 26–9 victory over the Minnesota Vikings with a groin injury. He was declared out for Week 3 against the Chicago Bears. On October 22, 2017, Watt made six combined tackles and made his fourth sack of the season on Cincinnati Bengals' quarterback Andy Dalton during the Steelers' 29–14 victory. He tied Bud Dupree (2014) and LaMarr Woodley (2007) for the franchise record for most sacks by a rookie with his fourth. On December 10, 2017, Watt recorded his first career forced fumble when he sacked Baltimore Raven's quarterback Joe Flacco with 12 seconds remaining in the game. The ball went out of bounds, but the game clock continued to run. Both teams seemed unaware of this until referees declared that the game was over. Watt finished his rookie season with 54 combined tackles (40 solo), seven pass deflections, seven sacks, one forced fumble, and an interception in 15 games and 15 starts.

The Pittsburgh Steelers finished atop the AFC North with a 13–3 record and earned a playoff berth. On January 14, 2018, Watt started his first NFL playoff game and recorded two combined tackles and deflected a pass in a narrow 45–42 loss to the Jacksonville Jaguars in the AFC Divisional Round.

2018 season
Watt entered training camp slated as a starting left outside linebacker. Head coach Mike Tomlin named Watt and Bud Dupree, who was now on the right side, the starting outside linebackers to begin the season, alongside inside linebackers Vince Williams and Jon Bostic.

Watt started in the season-opener at the Cleveland Browns and recorded a season-high ten combined tackles (seven solo), three sacks, and blocked a potential game-winning field goal during overtime in a 21–21 tie. He earned AFC Defensive Player of the Week for his performance. On October 7, 2018, Watt recorded eight combined tackles, tied his season-high of three sacks, and forced a fumble in the Steelers’ 41–17 win against the Atlanta Falcons. His performance earned him his second AFC Defensive Player of the Week award of the year. He started in all 16 games in 2018 and recorded 68 combined tackles (50 solo), 13 sacks, six forced fumbles, and three pass deflections. After the season, Watt was ranked 93rd on the NFL Top 100 Players of 2019.

2019 season

In Week 2 against the Seattle Seahawks, Watt recorded six tackles and made his first sack of the season on Russell Wilson in the 26–28 loss. In Week 3 against the San Francisco 49ers, Watt recorded his first interception of the season off Jimmy Garoppolo in the 24–20 loss. In Week 8 against the Miami Dolphins, Watt recorded two sacks on Ryan Fitzpatrick, one of which was a strip sack that he forced and recovered, in the 27–14 win. For his performance in November, Watt earned AFC Defensive Player of the Month.
In Week 14 against the Arizona Cardinals, Watt recorded his second interception of the season in the end zone off a pass thrown by Kyler Murray during the 23–17 win.

By the end of his third season, Watt had established himself as one of the best pass-rushers in the NFL, tallying an AFC-high 14.5 sacks and a league-high eight forced fumbles. He was named to the Pro Bowl. He was voted Team MVP by his teammates, being the first defensive player to win the award since Troy Polamalu in 2010. Watt was voted All-Pro as both edge rusher (1st Team) and linebacker (2nd Team). He was also nominated for the NFL Defensive Player of the Year award, finishing third in voting. Following the season, Watt was ranked 25th by his fellow players on the NFL Top 100 Players of 2020.

2020 season
On March 17, 2020, the Steelers signed Watt's older brother Derek, putting the two brothers on the same team. On April 28, 2020, the Steelers exercised the fifth-year option on Watt's contract.

In Week 1 against the New York Giants, Watt recorded his lone interception of the season off a pass thrown by Daniel Jones during the 26–16 win. In Week 2 against the Denver Broncos, Watt recorded his first 2.5 sacks of the season on Jeff Driskel during the 26–21 win. He was named the AFC Defensive Player of the Week for his performance in Week 2. On October 1, 2020, Watt was named the AFC Defensive Player of the Month for his performance in September. In Week 10 against the Cincinnati Bengals, Watt recorded two sacks on rookie quarterback Joe Burrow during the 36–10 win. In Week 12 against the Baltimore Ravens, Watt recorded two sacks on Robert Griffin III during the 19–14 win. Watt was named the AFC Defensive Player of the Month for his performance in November. In Week 16 against the Indianapolis Colts, Watt recorded two sacks on Philip Rivers, including a strip sack that was recovered by teammate Mike Hilton, during the 28–24 comeback win. On December 31, 2020, for the second straight season, Watt was voted Team MVP by his teammates. Despite leading the NFL in sacks (15), tackles for loss (23) and quarterback hits (41), he finished second in voting for the NFL Defensive Player of the Year award. Watt played in the Steelers lone playoff game, recording three combined tackles and deflected a pass as the Steelers lost to the Cleveland Browns 48–37 in the AFC Wild Card Round. He earned Pro Bowl and First Team All-Pro honors. Prior to the upcoming season, Watt's peers voted him ninth on the NFL Top 100 Players of 2021.

2021 season: Defensive Player of the Year
On September 9, 2021, Watt and the Steelers agreed to a four-year extension worth over $112 million with $80 million guaranteed, making him the highest paid defensive player in the NFL. In Week 1 against the Buffalo Bills, Watt made three tackles and two sacks on quarterback Josh Allen, one of which Watt also forced a fumble which was recovered by teammate Cameron Heyward in the 23–16 win. The following week, Watt recorded four tackles, one sack and one forced fumble against the Las Vegas Raiders before leaving the game with a groin injury. He was later ruled out for Week 3. In Week 6 against the Seattle Seahawks, Watt played a large role in the 23–20 win in overtime, tallying seven total tackles, three tackles for loss, three passes defended, and two sacks,  one of which was a strip sack in overtime that led to the game-winning field goal. He was named the AFC Defensive Player of the Week for his performance in Week 6. In Week 13, Watt was a huge factor in helping the Steelers defeat the Baltimore Ravens, 20–19. He had six combined tackles (five solo), 3.5 sacks, three tackles for loss, six quarterback hits and a forced fumble. With 12 seconds remaining in the game and the Steelers ahead by one point, the Ravens attempted a 2-point conversion for the win. Watt was able to put pressure on Lamar Jackson and disrupt the pass, sealing the victory for his team. His performance earned him AFC Defensive Player of the Week. In the Steelers’ 19–13 win over the Tennessee Titans in Week 15, Watt recorded 1.5 sacks on quarterback Ryan Tannehill. This gave Watt a total of 17.5 sacks on the season, a franchise record, surpassing the mark previously set by James Harrison in 2008. In Week 17, Watt earned his third AFC Defensive Player of the Week for the year, in a victory over the Cleveland Browns, 26–14. In this game, Watt recorded five tackles (all solo), four sacks, three tackles for loss, five quarterback hits and two passes defended. On January 6, 2022, the Steelers named Watt their Team MVP. He became the only player in team history to win the award in three-straight seasons. In Week 18, Watt tied Michael Strahan's 20-year old NFL single-season sack record, with a sack of Baltimore's Tyler Huntley during their 16–13 overtime win. Despite missing two games and parts of three others, Watt ended the regular season leading the league in sacks (22.5), tackles for loss (21) and quarterback hits (39) for the second year in a row. He was named to the Pro Bowl and earned First Team All-Pro honors.

In the AFC Wild Card Round against the Kansas City Chiefs, Watt recovered a fumble forced by teammate Cameron Heyward and returned it 26 yards for a touchdown in the first half of the 42–21 loss. 

At the 11th Annual NFL Honors, Watt won NFL Defensive Player of the Year. He was ranked sixth by his fellow players on the NFL Top 100 Players of 2022.

2022 season
In Week 1 against the Cincinnati Bengals, Watt left the game in the fourth quarter with a pectoral injury during the 23–20 overtime win, after attempting to sack quarterback Joe Burrow. He was placed on injured reserve. 

On October 8, it was reported that Watt had recently undergone arthroscopic knee surgery for an injury sustained in the preseason.

On October 26, the Steelers opened the 21-day practice window for Watt's return. He was activated from injured reserve on November 11, 2022.

He finished the 2022 Season with 39 tackles, two interceptions, one forced fumble, and a career low 5.5 sacks in 10 games played. Despite this, Watt was voted to his fifth consecutive Pro Bowl.

NFL career statistics

Personal life
Born the youngest of three boys, Watt was raised by his parents, Connie and John Watt, in Pewaukee, Wisconsin. His father was a firefighter for 25 years and his mother is the vice president of an independent inspections company. His two older brothers, J. J. and Derek, both played at Wisconsin. Derek is a fullback for the Pittsburgh Steelers and was selected in the sixth round by the then-San Diego Chargers with the 198th overall pick in the 2016 NFL Draft, before signing with the Steelers in 2020. J. J. is a former three-time NFL Defensive Player of the Year and five-time All-Pro defensive end who was selected by the Houston Texans with the 11th overall pick in the 2011 NFL Draft. T. J. was teammates with Derek at Wisconsin from 2012 to 2015. During his time at Wisconsin, Watt majored in retailing and consumer behavior.

He married professional soccer player Dani Rhodes on July 9, 2022.

References

External links

Pittsburgh Steelers bio
Wisconsin Badgers bio

1994 births
Living people
American Conference Pro Bowl players
American football linebackers
American people of Scottish descent
National Football League Defensive Player of the Year Award winners
People from Pewaukee, Wisconsin
Pittsburgh Steelers players
Players of American football from Wisconsin
Sportspeople from the Milwaukee metropolitan area
Wisconsin Badgers football players